Daniel Henriksson (born September 4, 1978) is a retired Swedish professional ice hockey goaltender. During his career he played for Luleå HF, Färjestads BK, and Linköpings HC in Elitserien, for Sibir Novosibirsk in the Russian Super League and for EC Red Bull Salzburg in the Austrian Hockey League. He won the Swedish Championship with Färjestad in 2006.

He represented Sweden at three Ice Hockey World Championships, winning a gold medal in 2006 and a silver medal in 2004.

External links

1978 births
Living people
People from Övertorneå Municipality
Swedish ice hockey goaltenders
Swedish expatriate sportspeople in Austria
Swedish expatriate sportspeople in Russia
Färjestad BK players
Linköping HC players
Luleå HF players
Sportspeople from Norrbotten County